Kol Ha'ir (lit The Whole City, also a homophone for Voice of the City) is a weekly local newspaper published in Jerusalem. It is part of the Schocken Group publishing network.

See also
List of Israeli newspapers

Publications with year of establishment missing
Hebrew-language newspapers
Mass media in Jerusalem